A Comprehensive Grammar of the English Language is a descriptive grammar of English written by Randolph Quirk, Sidney Greenbaum, Geoffrey Leech, and Jan Svartvik. It was first published by Longman in 1985.

In 1991, it was called "The greatest of contemporary grammars, because it is the most thorough and detailed we have," and "It is a grammar that transcends national boundaries."

The book relies on elicitation experiments as well as three corpora: a corpus from the Survey of English Usage, the Lancaster-Oslo-Bergen Corpus (UK English), and the Brown Corpus (US English).

Reviews
In 1988, Huddleston published a very critical review of the 1985 book A Comprehensive Grammar of the English Language. He wrote:[T]here are some respects in which it is seriously flawed and disappointing. A number of quite basic categories and concepts do not seem to have been thought through with sufficient care; this results in a remarkable amount of unclarity and inconsistency in the analysis, and in the organization of the grammar.

See also
 Longman Grammar of Spoken and Written English
 Cambridge Grammar of the English Language

Notes 

1985 non-fiction books
English grammar books
Corpus linguistics